Firas Zaal Al-Mohammed (born 2 February 1977) is a Syrian athlete, who is specialized in javelin throw. Twice during his career he participated at the World Championships: Athens 1997 and Helsinki 2005 (he finished both in qualifying rounds). He won the bronze medal in javelin at the 2005 Mediterranean Games. His personal best is 80.50 metres.

Personal bests
Javelin – 80.50 m NR (Beirut 1999)

Competition record

References

External links
 

1977 births
Living people
Syrian male javelin throwers
Olympic athletes of Syria
Mediterranean Games bronze medalists for Syria
Mediterranean Games medalists in athletics
Athletes (track and field) at the 2005 Mediterranean Games
20th-century Syrian people
21st-century Syrian people
Athletes (track and field) at the 1998 Asian Games
Athletes (track and field) at the 2002 Asian Games
Athletes (track and field) at the 2006 Asian Games